Pterois is a genus of venomous marine fish, commonly known as lionfish, native to the Indo-Pacific. It is characterized by conspicuous warning coloration with red or black bands, and ostentatious dorsal fins tipped with venomous spines. Pterois radiata, Pterois volitans, and Pterois miles are the most commonly studied species in the genus. Pterois species are popular aquarium fish. P. volitans and P. miles are recent and significant invasive species in the west Atlantic, Caribbean Sea and Mediterranean Sea.

Taxonomy
Pterois was described as a genus in 1817 by German naturalist, botanist, biologist, and ornithologist Lorenz Oken. In 1856 the French naturalist Eugène Anselme Sébastien Léon Desmarest designated Scorpaena volitans, which had been named by Bloch in 1787 and which was the same as Linnaeus's 1758 Gasterosteus volitans, as the type species of the genus. This genus is classified within the tribe Pteroini of the subfamily Scorpaeninae within the family Scorpaenidae. The genus name Pterois is based on Georges Cuvier's 1816 French name, “Les Pterois”, meaning "fins" which is an allusion to the high dorsal and long pectoral fins.

Species 
Currently, 12 recognized species are in this genus:

Molecular studies and morphological data have indicated that P. lunulata is a junior synonym of P. russelii, and that P. volitans may be a hybrid between P. miles and P. russelii sensu lato.

Description 
Juvenile lionfish have a unique tentacle located above their eye sockets that varies in phenotype between species. The evolution of this tentacle is suggested to serve to continually attract new prey; studies also suggest it plays a role in sexual selection.

Ecology and behavior
Pterois species can live from 5 to 15 years and have complex courtship and mating behaviors. Females frequently release two mucus-filled egg clusters, which can contain as many as 15,000 eggs. All species are aposematic; they have conspicuous coloration with boldly contrasting stripes and wide fans of projecting spines, advertising their ability to defend themselves.

Prey

Pterois prey mostly on small fish, invertebrates, and mollusks, with up to six different species of prey found in the gastrointestinal tracts of some specimens. Lionfish feed most actively in the morning. Lionfish are skilled hunters, using specialized swim bladder muscles to provide precise control of their location in the water column, allowing them to alter their center of gravity to better attack prey. They blow jets of water while approaching prey, which serves to confuse them and alter the orientation of the prey so that the smaller fish is facing the lionfish. This results in a higher degree of predatory efficiency as head-first capture is easier for the lionfish. The lionfish then spreads its large pectoral fins and swallows its prey in a single motion.

Predators and parasites
Aside from instances of larger lionfish individuals engaging in cannibalism on smaller individuals, adult lionfish have few identified natural predators, likely due to the effectiveness of their venomous spines: when threatened, a lionfish will orient its body to keep its dorsal fin pointed at the predator, even if this means swimming upsidedown. This does not always save it, however: moray eels, bluespotted cornetfish, and large groupers have been observed preying on lionfish. Sharks are also believed to be capable of preying on lionfish with no ill effects from their spines. Park officials of the Roatan Marine Park in Honduras have attempted to train sharks to feed on lionfish to control the invasive populations in the Caribbean. The Bobbit worm, an ambush predator, has been filmed preying upon lionfish in Indonesia. Predators of larvae and juvenile lionfish remain unknown, but may prove to be the primary limiting factor of lionfish populations in their native range.

Parasites of lionfish have rarely been observed, and are assumed to be infrequent. They include isopods and leeches.

Interaction with humans
Lionfish are known for their venomous fin rays, which makes them hazardous to other marine animals, as well as humans. Pterois venom produced negative inotropic and chronotropic effects when tested in both frog and clam hearts and has a depressive effect on rabbit blood pressure. These results are thought to be due to nitric oxide release. In humans, Pterois venom can cause systemic effects such as pain, nausea, vomiting, fever, headache, numbness, paresthesia, diarrhea, sweating, temporary paralysis of the limbs, respiratory insufficiency, heart failure, convulsions, and even death. Fatalities are more common in very young children, the elderly, or those who are allergic to the venom. The venom is rarely fatal to healthy adults, but some species have enough venom to produce extreme discomfort for a period of several days. Moreover, Pterois venom poses a danger to allergic victims as they may experience anaphylaxis, a serious and often life-threatening condition that requires immediate emergency medical treatment. Severe allergic reactions to Pterois venom include chest pain, severe breathing difficulties, a drop in blood pressure, swelling of the tongue, sweating, or slurred speech. Such reactions can be fatal if not treated.

Lionfish are edible if prepared correctly.

Native range and habitat

The lionfish is native to the to the Indian Ocean and Western Pacific Ocean. They can be found around the seaward edge of shallow coral reefs, lagoons, rocky substrates, and on mesophotic reefs, and can live in areas of varying salinity, temperature, and depth. They are also frequently found in turbid inshore areas and harbors, and have a generally hostile attitude and are territorial toward other reef fish. They are commonly found from shallow waters down to past  depth, and have in several locations been recorded to 300 m depth. Many universities in the Indo-Pacific have documented reports of Pterois aggression toward divers and researchers. P. volitans and P. miles are native to subtropical and tropical regions from southern Japan and southern Korea to the east coast of Australia, Indonesia, Micronesia, French Polynesia, and the South Pacific Ocean.<ref name=l>{{cite journal |last=Schultz |first=E. T. |year=1986 |title=Pterois volitans and Pterois miles: Two valid species |journal=Copeia |volume=1986 |issue=3 |pages=686–690 |doi=10.2307/1444950 |jstor=1444950}}</ref> P. miles is also found in the Indian Ocean, from Sumatra to Sri Lanka and the Red Sea.

 Invasive introduction and range 

Western tropical Atlantic
Two of the 12 species of Pterois, the red lionfish (P. volitans) and the common lionfish (P. miles), have established themselves as significant invasive species off the East Coast of the United States and in the Caribbean. About 93% of the invasive population in the Western Atlantic is P. volitans.

The red lionfish is found off the East Coast and Gulf Coast of the United States and in the Caribbean Sea, and was likely first introduced off the Florida coast by the early to mid-1990s. This introduction may have occurred in 1992 when Hurricane Andrew destroyed an aquarium in southern Florida, releasing six lionfish into Biscayne Bay. A lionfish was discovered off the coast of Dania Beach, south Florida, as early as 1985, before Hurricane Andrew. The lionfish resemble those of the Philippines, implicating the aquarium trade, suggesting individuals may have been purposely discarded by dissatisfied aquarium enthusiasts. This is in part because lionfish require an experienced aquarist, but are often sold to novices who find their care too difficult. In 2001, the National Oceanic and Atmospheric Administration (NOAA) documented several sightings of lionfish off the coast of Florida, Georgia, South Carolina, North Carolina, Bermuda, and Delaware. Lionfish were first detected in the Bahamas in 2004. In June 2013 lionfish were discovered as far east as Barbados, and as far south as the Los Roques Archipelago and many Venezuelan continental beaches. Lionfish were first sighted in Brazilian waters in late 2014. Genetic testing on a single captured individual revealed that it was related to the populations found in the Caribbean, suggesting larval dispersal rather than an intentional release.

Adult lionfish specimens are now found along the United States East Coast from Cape Hatteras, North Carolina, to Florida, and along the Gulf Coast to Texas. They are also found off Bermuda, the Bahamas, and throughout the Caribbean, including the Turks and Caicos, Haiti, Cuba, the Dominican Republic, the Cayman Islands, Aruba, Curacao, Trinidad and Tobago, Bonaire, Puerto Rico, St. Croix, Belize, Honduras, Colombia and Mexico. Population densities continue to increase in the invaded areas, resulting in a population boom of up to 700% in some areas between 2004 and 2008.Pterois species are known for devouring many other aquarium fishes, unusual in that they are among the few fish species to successfully establish populations in open marine systems.

Pelagic larval dispersion is assumed to occur through oceanic currents, including the Gulf Stream and the Caribbean Current. Ballast water can also contribute to the dispersal.

Extreme temperatures present geographical constraints in the distribution of aquatic species, indicating temperature tolerance plays a role in the lionfish's survival, reproduction, and range of distribution. The abrupt differences in water temperatures north and south of Cape Hatteras directly correlate with the abundance and distribution of Pterois. Pterois expanded along the southeastern coast of the United States and occupied thermal-appropriate zones within 10 years, and the shoreward expansion of this thermally appropriate habitat is expected in coming decades as winter water temperatures warm in response to anthropogenic climate change. Although the timeline of observations points to the east coast of Florida as the initial source of the western Atlantic invasion, the relationship of the United States East Coast and Bahamian lionfish invasion is uncertain. Lionfish can tolerate a minimum salinity of 5 ppt (0.5%) and even withstand pulses of fresh water, which means they can also be found in estuaries of freshwater rivers.

The lionfish invasion is considered to be one of the most serious recent threats to Caribbean and Florida coral reef ecosystems. To help address the pervasive problem, in 2015, the NOAA partnered with the Gulf and Caribbean Fisheries Institute to set up a lionfish portal to provide scientifically accurate information on the invasion and its impacts. The lionfish web portal is aimed at all those involved and affected, including coastal managers, educators, and the public, and the portal was designed as a source of training videos, fact sheets, examples of management plans, and guidelines for monitoring. The web portal draws on the expertise of NOAA's own scientists, as well as that of other scientists and policy makers from academia or NGOs, and managers.

 Mediterranean 
Lionfish have also established themselves in parts of the Mediterranean - with records down to 110 m depth. Lionfish have been found in waters around Cyprus, Greece, Israel, Lebanon, Malta, Syria, and Turkey and Croatia. Warming sea temperatures may be allowing lionfish to further expand their range in the Mediterranean.

 Long-term effects of invasion 
Lionfish have successfully pioneered the coastal waters of the Atlantic in less than a decade, and pose a major threat to reef ecological systems in these areas. A study comparing their abundance from Florida to North Carolina with several species of groupers found they were second only to the native scamp grouper and equally abundant to the graysby, gag, and rock hind. This could be due to a surplus of resource availability resulting from the overfishing of lionfish predators like grouper. Although the lionfish has not expanded to a population size currently causing major ecological problems, their invasion in the United States coastal waters could lead to serious problems in the future. One likely ecological impact caused by Pterois could be their impact on prey population numbers by directly affecting food web relationships. This could ultimately lead to reef deterioration and could negatively influence Atlantic trophic cascade. Lionfish have already been shown to overpopulate reef areas and display aggressive tendencies, forcing native species to move to waters where conditions might be less than favorable.

Lionfish could be reducing Atlantic reef diversity by up to 80%. In July 2011, lionfish were reported for the first time in the Flower Garden Banks National Marine Sanctuary off the coast of Louisiana. Sanctuary officials said they believe the species will be a permanent fixture, but hope to monitor and possibly limit their presence.

Since lionfish thrive so well in the Atlantic and the Caribbean due to nutrient-rich waters and lack of predators, the species has spread tremendously. A single lionfish, located on a reef, reduced young juvenile reef fish populations by 79%.

 Control and eradication efforts 

Red lionfish are an invasive species, yet relatively little is known about them. NOAA research foci include investigating biotechnical solutions for control of the population, and understanding how the larvae are dispersed. Another important area of study is what controls the population in its native area. Researchers hope to discover what moderates lionfish populations in the Indo-Pacific and apply this information to control the invasive populations, without introducing additional invasive species.

Two new trap designs have been introduced to help with deep-water control of the lionfish. The traps are low and vertical and remain open the entire time of deployment. The vertical relief of the trap attracts lionfish, which makes catching them easier. These new traps are good for catching lionfish without affecting the native species that are ecologically, recreationally, and commercially important to the surrounding areas. These traps are more beneficial than older traps because they limit the potential of catching noninvasive creatures, they have bait that is only appealing to lionfish, they guarantee a catch, and they are easy to transport.

Rigorous and repeated removal of lionfish from invaded waters could potentially control the exponential expansion of the lionfish in invaded waters. A 2010 study showed effective maintenance would require the monthly harvest of at least 27% of the adult population. Because lionfish are able to reproduce monthly, this effort must be maintained throughout the entire year.

Even to accomplish these numbers seems unlikely, but as populations of lionfish continue to grow throughout the Caribbean and Western Atlantic, actions are being taken to attempt to control the quickly growing numbers. In November 2010, for the first time the Florida Keys National Marine Sanctuary began licensing divers to kill lionfish inside the sanctuary in an attempt to eradicate the fish.

Conservation groups and community organizations in the Eastern United States have organized hunting expeditions for Pterois such as the Environment Education Foundation's 'lionfish derby' held annually in Florida. Divemasters from Cozumel to the Honduran Bay Islands and at Reef Conservation International which operates in the Sapodilla Cayes Marine Reserve off Punta Gorda, Belize, now routinely spear them during dives. While diver culling removes lionfish from shallow reefs reducing their densities, lionfish have widely been reported on mesophotic coral ecosystems (reefs from 30 to 150 m) in the western Atlantic and even in deep-sea habitats (greater than 200 m depth). Recent studies have suggested that the effects of culling are likely to be depth-specific, and so have limited impacts on these deeper reef populations. Therefore, other approaches such as trapping are advocated for removing lionfish from deeper reef habitats.

Long-term culling has also been recorded to cause behavior changes in lionfish populations. For example, in the Bahamas, lionfish on heavily culled reefs have become more wary of divers and hide more within the reef structure during the day when culling occurs. Similar lionfish responses to divers have been observed when comparing culled sites and sites without culling in Honduras, including altered lionfish behaviour on reefs too deep for regular culling, but adjacent to heavily culled sites potentially implying movement of individuals between depths.

While culling by marine protection agencies and volunteer divers is an important element of control efforts, development of market-based approaches, which create commercial incentives for removals, has been seen as a means to sustain control efforts. The foremost of these market approaches is the promotion of lionfish as a food item. Another is the use of lionfish spines, fins, and tails for jewelry and other decorative items. Lionfish jewelry production initiatives are underway in Belize, the Bahamas, St. Vincent, and the Grenadines.

In 2014 at Jardines de la Reina National Marine Park in Cuba, a diver experimented with spearing and feeding lionfish to sharks in an effort to teach them to seek out the fish as prey. By 2016, Cuba was finding it more effective to fish for lionfish as food.

 "Lionfish as Food" campaign 

In 2010, NOAA (which also encourages people to report lionfish sightings, to help track lionfish population dispersal) began a campaign to encourage the consumption of the fish. The "Lionfish as Food" campaign encourages human hunting of the fish as the only form of control known to date. Increasing the catch of lionfish could not only help maintain a reasonable population density, but also provide an alternative fishing source to overfished populations, such as grouper and snapper. The taste is described as "buttery and tender". To promote the campaign, the Roman Catholic Church in Colombia agreed to have their clergy's sermons suggest to their parishioners (84% of the population) eating lionfish on Fridays, Lent, and Easter, which proved highly successful in decreasing the invasive fish problem.

When properly filleted, the naturally venomous fish is safe to eat. Some concern exists about the risk of ciguatera food poisoning (CFP) from consumption of lionfish, and the FDA included lionfish on the list of species with risk for CFP when lionfish are harvested in some areas tested positive for ciguatera. No cases of CFP from consumption of lionfish have been verified, and published research has found that the toxins in lionfish venom may be causing false positives in tests for presence of ciguatera. The Reef Environmental Education Foundation provides advice to restaurant chefs on how they can incorporate the fish into their menus. The NOAA calls the lionfish a "delicious, delicately flavored fish" similar in texture to grouper. Cooking techniques and preparations for lionfish include deep-frying, ceviche, jerky, grilling, and sashimi.

Another initiative is centered around production of leather from lionfish hides. It seeks to establish a production chain and market for high quality leather produced from the hides. The goal is to control invasive lionfish populations while providing economic benefit to local fishing communities.

See also

 Dendrochirus'', the dwarf lionfishes
 List of venomous animals

References 

 
Pteroini
Venomous fish
Marine fish genera
Taxa named by Lorenz Oken
Invasive species in the Mediterranean Sea